Simão (born July 10, 1976) is an Angolan football player. He has played for Angola national team.

National team statistics

References

1976 births
Living people
Angolan footballers

Association football midfielders
Angola international footballers